Peter Jankowitsch (born July 10, 1933) is a former Austrian diplomat and politician.

Biography 
He was born in Vienna, Austria. A law graduate, he is a member of the Austrian Social Democratic Party (SPÖ). From 1983 to 1986, 1987 to 1990 and 1992 to 1993 he was a member of the Nationalrat, from 1986 to 1987 Federal Minister of Foreign Affairs. From 1990 to 1992 he joined the government again as a secretary of state in the Federal Chancellery. From 1993 to 1998 he was Austria's ambassador at the OECD in Paris. He is a former member of the Steering Committee of the Bilderberg Group.

Notes and references 

1933 births
Living people
Foreign ministers of Austria
Members of the National Council (Austria)
Members of the Steering Committee of the Bilderberg Group
Ambassadors of Austria to the Organisation for Economic Co-operation and Development
Recipients of the Cross of the Order of Merit of the Federal Republic of Germany